Shah Qotb ol Din (also Romanized as Shāh Qoṭb ol Dīn and Shāh Qoṭb od Dīn) is a village in Beyza Rural District, Beyza District, Sepidan County, Fars Province, Iran. At the 2006 census, its population was 510, in 126 families.

References 

Populated places in Beyza County